Infinity (stylized as ∞) is the second international studio album and fifth overall release by Filipino pop and R&B singer Jake Zyrus (formerly  Charice). The album was released exclusively early in Japan on October 5, 2011 by Warner Bros. Records. The album was credited under the name Charice, Zyrus' name prior to his gender transition.

Zyrus launched a seven-city tour across Asia in order to promote the official Asian release of the album in Summer 2012. The tour began on March 2, 2012.

The album's release in America was planned, but eventually cancelled.

Background
On August 16, 2011, Zyrus's record label, Warner Bros. Records, announced their plans to release his second studio album early in Japan on October 5, 2011. On August 30 it was announced that the album would be titled Infinity.

On March 28, 2012, Zyrus said that he had been working on the American release of the album and that its track listing would differ from the Asian version. No release date had been decided at the time.

On July 27, 2013, he revealed the main reason why the album was never released in America: "Some of the songs didn't pass their standards. They're more about upbeat, danceable songs over there," he said in a statement.

Composition
"Before It Explodes" was released as the album's lead single on April 18, 2011. "Louder" was released as the album's second single. Bundled with another track titled "Lost the Best Thing", the song was released on May 20, 2011. "One Day" was released as promotional single as a part of Acuvue's "ACUVUE® 1•DAY Contest".

"Far as the Sky" was served as single in Japan on July 27, 2011 for the Japanese drama series, Bull Doctor. "New World" was then released as single in Japan and is featured in Square Enix's role-playing video game Final Fantasy XIII-2.

Release and promotion
To promote the early exclusive release of the album in Japan, Zyrus held a free concert titled "Special 'One Day' Free Live" at Shinjuku Square Garden in Tokyo. Around 1,000 fans reportedly turned up to watch Zyrus perform five songs from the second album despite the bad weather and he also thanked them for coming. He also chose four dancers from the audience to accompany him on one of his stage performances.

Track listing

Charts and certification

Release history

References

2011 albums
Jake Zyrus albums
Albums produced by Rico Love
Albums produced by the Smeezingtons